Paul H. Richards, II (born 1955/1956) is an American politician who is a former mayor of Lynwood, California.  He was sentenced to federal prison in 2006 on federal bribery and kickback charges.

Early life and education
Born in California, Richards attended Compton High School, where he was ASB President. He also served an internship  with the Model Cities Program. He attended California State University, Dominguez Hills, earning his bachelor's degree in Economics and Business Administration with honors. By age 21, Richards had earned a master's degree in Public Administration with emphases in Economics and Public Policy from the University of Southern California. Richards received his doctorate from the UCLA School of Law where he was honored as a Chancellor Marshall of his graduating Class. He was then admitted to practice law in California.

Public service 
After earning his degree, Richards went to work for the City of Carson, California where he administered a crime prevention program. He later organized the Career Development Institute, which assisted over 2000 youth prepare for professional careers.   After completing law school, Richards took a position at the City of Compton, California as an executive level administrator and special legal counsel. Richards drafted the Developer Relations Guidelines that helped to resolve issues within the City and its Redevelopment Agency. In 1995, Richards left Compton.

In November 1986, Richards was elected to the Lynwood City Council to complete the term (through December 1989) of council member Louis Thompson who had died in office. With his election, Blacks now comprised the majority of the 5-member City Council (with three Black council  members: Richards along with mayor Robert Henning and councilwoman and mayor pro tem Evelyn Wells; and two white council members: John Byork and E.L. Morris).  On December 2, 1986, the council deadlocked 2-2 on appointing a new mayor, the result of the absence of councilmember John Byork who had pneumonia. The council also deadlocked in agreeing to extend the date for the vote so Byork could return. Henning who supported his council ally, Evelyn Wells, as mayor, resigned on the same day making Wells acting mayor, the first woman and second African-American to hold the office in Lynwood. On December 16, 1986, Byork returned and the full council voted 3-1 for Paul Richards as mayor (Henning abstained, Wells voting against, and Richards, Byork, and council member E.L. Morris voted for the nomination). Although she relinquished the gavel, Wells physically refused to give up the center seat stating that as mayor pro tem, she should serve as the next mayor and that the only reason she was not chosen was because she was a woman. Richards appointment made him the third African-American to serve as mayor in Lynwood after Robert Henning, the city's first African-American mayor, and Evelyn Woods, the first female African-American mayor. In December 1987, he was appointed as mayor for an additional term. In January 1989, the council appointed Evelyn Wells as mayor. In December 1992, he was again appointed as mayor. Richards would continue to win 4-year terms on the City Council in the November elections held in 1993, 1997, and 2001; and would be appointed to the mayorship in 1993, 1994, 1995, 1996, 1997, and 2000.

In March 1996, he was defeated in the Democratic primary for the 37th U.S. congressional district. In the November 1997 election, he became the sole African-American  on the Lynwood City Council after Robert Henning was defeated in his re-election bid. This marked the beginning of a shift in political power from the declining African-American population to the growing Latino population (then 83% Latino and 17% Black) who now controlled the four remaining seats on the City Council.

Conviction
In October 2003, Richards was voted out as City Counselor in Lynwood in a recall election. Maria Teresa Santillan was elected as his successor to finish out the remainder of his term (through December 2005) on the City Council. On March 20, 2006, Richards was sentenced to 16 years in prison. This is the longest sentence in history for a political corruption case. He filed an appeal after being sentenced; however, the conviction was upheld.

Honorary offices 
 Member of the California State University Dominguez Hills, Foundation Board, 
 Vice Chairman of the Alameda Corridor Transportation Authority and was 
 Second Vice President of the National Black Caucus of Local Elected Officials.
 Past President of the League of California Cities ( L.A.) and President of The Independent Cities Association.
 Past Chair, National League of Cities

Certificates
Certificate in Management, Harvard University
 Certificate in Budget Analysis and Fiscal Problem Solving, University of Southern California
 Certificate of Public Program Management, Harvard University

Awards 

 NAACP Civil Rights Award and NAACP Role Model of the Year Award
 USC Outstanding Alumni Award and UCLA Outstanding Leadership Award
United States Conference of Mayors Outstanding Achievement Award.

References

Living people
Mayors of places in California
Year of birth missing (living people)
African-American mayors in California
1950s births
Mayors of Lynwood, California
American politicians convicted of federal public corruption crimes